Sonic Ranch, in the border town of Tornillo, Texas, is the world's largest residential recording studio complex. There are five studios designed by Vincent Van Haaff on a  pecan orchard, which borders the Rio Grande and Mexico. The studio was founded in 1989 by the current owner/director Tony Rancich around a large traditional Spanish hacienda, which is an adobe structure that was built in the late 1930s, with pine-tree vigas as the ceiling structure. Some rock bands have noted the calm, rural wilderness and easy access to Ciudad Juárez across the border.

Studio complex
The Neve Control Room (designed by Vincent Van Haaff) features an 80-channel vintage Neve 8078 Console with 31105 mic pre/EQs. The left side of this console was the original West Coast Motown board which was used to record many Motown artists, including Diana Ross, The Temptations, Gladys Knight, Bubba Knight, G. C. Cameron, James Jamerson, Marvin Gaye, and The Jackson 5. Madonna purchased the console and had it in her studio Brooklyn in Hollywood in the early 1990s, where Yoshiki Hayashi purchased and put it together with another 8078 into its present form by Pat Schnider and Wess Dolly. Sonic Ranch acquired this console in 2006. There are two isolation booths in the Big Tracking Room and two isolation booths in the large  Control Room.

The A Studio, which was the first studio to be established at Sonic Ranch, is partially subterranean and features a 40-channel E/G SSL console with vintage Neve outboard mic pre/EQs and has four tracking rooms with differing acoustics and dimensions.

The Stone Room is a five-sided room made of travertine stone, with a slanted latia ceiling which optimizes acoustic diffusion. When stripped of baffles and carpets, it serves as an echo chamber during mixdown. The center tracking room, leading to the Drum Room, has carpets and absorbable material between the traditional vigas in the ceiling structure which shortens the decay time in the room and makes it suitable for vocals and electric guitar tracking.

The Drum Room has a wood floor, a slanted wood ceiling and wooden doors which can be opened or closed to adjust the ambiance of the room. The top room, which descends into the control room, contains a  1978 K. Kawai piano and a 1961 Hammond B3 with a Leslie speaker.

The Adobe Studio was designed by Vincent Van Haaff within a hundred-year-old adobe structure with a vaulted wooden ceiling. It contains a vintage Neve 8088 console with Class A 31102 mic pre/EQs which were designed by Rupert Neve in 1977. This studio is on a property that contained one of the original "Custom House" crossing points from Mexico into the United States.

The Mix Room was designed by Vincent Van Haaff and is in the left wing of the original Spanish hacienda. It resides next to the swimming pool in the hacienda patio.

It features a Rupert Neve-designed Masterpiece. The Mastering room has wooden panels and colorful fabrics from Brussels and Paris woven into its acoustical design.

Equipment
Sonic Ranch has a collection of over 55 vintage and modern guitars, 50 vintage and mod amps, 4 modern and 3 vintage drum kits, 54 guitar pedals, 1927 Steinway and 1978 K. Kawai grand pianos, and a 1961 B3 organ with 147 Leslie. The mic collection includes 3 Neumann U47 Long Body Chrome Tops, 2 Neumann M249s, 2 Neumann KM 53s and 54s, 2 Steven Paul Audio Modified Neumann U67s, 2 Neumann M269s which are the European version of U67s, 3 Neumann U87s, 3 Telefunken ELAM 251s, 2 Telefunken ELAM 250s, 2 AKG C12s, and 2 Coles 4038s.

List of artists recorded
Following is a list of some of the artists who have recorded songs at Sonic Ranch:

Fiona Apple
Enrique Bunbury
Alex Campos
Arion
A Silent Film
Akron Family
Aneeka
Animal Collective
Ballyhoo! 
Bandalos Chinos
Band of Horses
Benny Ibarra
Beach House
Big Thief
Billy Gibbons
Blacklite District
Bon Iver
 *LASSO
Juanes
Tainy
Okills
Rey Pila 

Broncho
Bullet for My Valentine
The Burning of Rome
The Black Angels
The Blackout
Brand New
Cannibal Corpse
Ultima Victima
The Chamanas
Cloud Nothings
Cody Jinks and the Tone Deaf Hippies
Conor Oberst and the Mystic Valley Band
El Cuarteto de Nos
The Devil Makes Three
El Mató Un Policía Motorizado
Gregg Rolie
Grouplove
Gungor
Taking Back Sunday
Yeah Yeah Yeahs
Enrique Bunbury
Gogol Bordello
Johnny Rawls
Smith Westerns
Sublime with Rome
Mudvayne
Ministry
Nico Vega
At The Drive-In
The London
James Vincent McMorrow
...And You Will Know Us by the Trail of Dead
Hanson
Hello Seahorse!
Your Vegas
Damageplan
DevilDriver
Dead Sara
Old 97's
Sparta
Sleepercar
Snarky Puppy
Tesla
Intocable
Zoé
Kalimba
Yuridia
Ely Guerra
Into the Presence
Jumbo
Jenny Lewis
Oh Sees
OV7
Prong
Plastilina Mosh
Erik Rubin
Moderatto
Motel
Kids These Days
Jello Biafra
Girl in a Coma
The Blackout
Camera Can't Lie
This World Fair
Nevermore
Shearwater
The Warning (Mexican band)

Elefante
Flogging Molly
Kids in Glass Houses
Jesus Adrian Romero
Lennon Murphy
McFly
MercyMe
Natalia Lafourcade
David Garza
Deep Blue Something
Rorschach Test
Flotsam and Jetsam
N17
Reik
Red Sun Rising
Skinlab
Explosions in the Sky
Midland
The New Mastersounds
The Maine
The Madden Brothers
of Montreal
Parquet Courts
Passafire
Poliça
Portugal. The Man
Prehab
Purple
The Dirty Heads
Dirty Karma
Swans
Radius
Otis Clay
Barbara Carr
Starbomb
Shadow Academy
Waxahatchee
The Lawrence Arms
Midland
División Minúscula
Lil Yachty

List of producers / engineers
Following is a list of some of the producers and/or engineers who have recorded and/or mixed songs at Sonic Ranch:

References

External links
 SonicRanch.com
 Sonic Ranch on Instagram
 Sonic Ranch on Facebook
 Sonic Ranch on Twitter

Recording studios in the United States
Companies based in El Paso, Texas
1989 establishments in Texas
Tornillo, Texas